F2 Gallery was a contemporary art gallery in Beijing, China founded by art dealer Fabien Fryns. Established in 2005, the gallery is located in the Caochangdi Art District and has held exhibitions by both Western and Chinese contemporary artists, including Henry Hudson (artist)
Sheng Qi, Wu Junyong and Zeng Fanzhi. The gallery's first opening included the high-profile artists Julian Schnabel and Jean-Michel Basquiat.

See also 
Caochangdi
Fabien Fryns
Sheng Qi
Wu Junyong
Zeng Fanzhi
Henry Hudson (artist)

References

External links 
Official website of F2 Gallery
City Weekend article about F2

Contemporary art galleries in China
Museums in Beijing